Huoqiu railway station is a railway station in Huoqiu County, Lu'an, Anhui, China. It is an intermediate station on the Fuyang–Lu'an railway. It opened on 2 July 2014.

References 

Railway stations in Anhui
Railway stations in China opened in 2014